Taras Hill or Chernecha Hora (literally, Monk's Hill) is a hill on the bank of the Dnieper near Kaniv in Ukraine and an important landmark of the Shevchenko National Preserve where the remains of the famous Ukrainian poet and artist Taras Shevchenko have been buried since 1861. The original site of Shevchenko's burial is the Smolensky Cemetery in St. Petersburg and later his body was moved to the banks of Dnieper.

The hill formerly belonged to Kaniv's Holy Dormition monastery (Eastern Orthodox) that existed here since the 11th century. The monastery was the burial place of several hetmans of Ukraine: Ivan Pidkova, Samiylo Kishka and others.

Due to the 100th Anniversary of Shevchenko birth, in 1914 the Russian government dispatched gendarmes and cossacks to prevent pilgrimage to the burial.

Since 1923 the hill was part of the Kaniv Nature Preserve. In 1926 the special Kaniv Museum-Preserve of Shevchenko was created. In 1939 a Russian sculptor Matvey Manizer (architect Yevgeniy Levinson) created the bronze statue that along with newly built museum building built by Ukrainian architects Vasyl Krychevsky and Petro Kostyrko became the main features of the location.

It was on the Taras Hill that Oleksa Hirnyk burned himself to death in protest of Soviet suppression of the Ukrainian language, culture and history in 1978. It happened on the 60th anniversary of the initial declaration of Ukrainian independence in 1918.

At present, the mount belongs to the Shevchenko National Preserve dedicated to the poet and is a place of mass visits from all over the country and abroad. A Church in memory of Taras Shevchenko (Tarasova Cerkva) is planned to be built here.

Chernecha Hora is considered to be a historical, natural and cultural monument of All-Ukrainian importance and national relic of Ukraine.

References

External links
 Historical outlook at the Shevchenko Preserve website

Hills of Ukraine
Dnieper Upland
 
Dnieper basin
Museums in Cherkasy Oblast
Poetry museums
Biographical museums in Ukraine
Kaniv